Yūko Andō may refer to:

Yūko Andō (singer) (born 1977), Japanese singer-songwriter
Yūko Andō (news anchor) (born 1958), Japanese TV presenter and news anchor